Ahn Ji-hye (born 1987) is a South Korean actress. She is best known to North American audiences for her performance in the film In Her Place, for which she garnered a Canadian Screen Award nomination for Best Actress at the 3rd Canadian Screen Awards in 2015, and a Wildflower Film Award nomination for Best New Actress at the 3rd Wildflower Film Awards in 2016.

References

External links
 
  (filmography mixed with the 1989 born actress of the same name)
 

1987 births
Living people
South Korean film actresses